"The Long Con" is the 38th episode of Lost. It is the 13th episode of the second season. The episode was directed by Roxann Dawson, and written by Leonard Dick and Steven Maeda. It first aired on February 8, 2006, on ABC. The character of James "Sawyer" Ford is featured in the episode's flashbacks.

Plot summary

Flashbacks
In flashbacks, Sawyer attempts to con a divorced woman named Cassidy. While getting dressed, Sawyer "accidentally" opens a briefcase filled with fake cash bundles made from newspaper. Cassidy sees through the con immediately. She claims that she did not get a significant settlement in the proceedings, and notices that most of the money is newsprint. Cassidy is also intrigued, and asks Sawyer to teach her how to con someone.

The two scheme a jewelry con by overpricing fake goods, and con two men at a gas station.  They perpetrate various cons over the ensuing months.  Then Cassidy asks if he can teach her how to pull off a "long con", and reveals that she did indeed receive a settlement of $600,000 in her divorce. Sawyer is later at a diner (his waitress is Diane, Kate's mother), having lunch with Gordy, his partner. It is revealed that Sawyer was planning to con Cassidy out of her money, but wants to back out due to his feelings for her.  Gordy threatens Sawyer and Cassidy's lives if Sawyer doesn't continue with the con.

In the last flashback, Sawyer returns to the house and tells Cassidy to run because Sawyer's partner Gordy is going to kill them, and points to a car outside. He reveals that the "long con" is Cassidy herself, and that he knew about her money from the beginning, but Gordy is going to kill them because Sawyer doesn't want to steal Cassidy's money. He sends her off with the money, packed in a bag. He goes to the car, which turns out to be empty. He then returns to the house and retrieves the real money, which he had concealed while he tricked Cassidy.

On the Island
Jack and Locke secure all the weapons, medicine, and Virgin Mary statues in the storeroom. Jack puts the six guns in the U.S. Marshal's suitcase, along with the key, in the gun cache. The two agree that no one else should be privy to the combination, and that each one will not gain access without the other being present.

Sawyer remarks that he and Charlie are now the two most hated people on the island. Charlie replies by telling Sawyer he ought to be more concerned about Jack ransacking his tent. Sawyer confronts Jack, who explains that he is simply returning the pain killers which Sawyer stole. Sawyer replies that the pain killers were actually stolen from his "stash" while he was on the raft. Sawyer also points out to Kate that Jack is now confiding in Ana Lucía rather than her.

Ana Lucía asks Jack if Locke gave him the combination for the guns, and he responds that he did. Ana feels that the survivors "aren't scared enough" and that they all feel they are safe. Ana then asks Jack for the combination, but when Jack hesitates, Ana tells him she was just kidding.

While Kate is reading to Sawyer, he mentions the army that Jack and Ana Lucía are forming. Meanwhile, in an attempt to assuage Sayid's grief over the death of Shannon, Hurley attempts to connect with Sayid. Hurley tells Sayid that he went to Rose and Bernard's tent, and got their radio from the Arrow Hatch. Hurley also has discovered that Bernard was the one who picked up Boone's transmission from the Nigerian Drug Plane. He asks Sayid if he can boost the power somehow to help them send another signal, but Sayid says that it would not work.

Sun is working in her garden when she hears a noise coming from the foliage.  Her fears are alleviated when Vincent runs into the garden.  Just after Vincent leaves, a burlap bag is put over her head, her hands are tied together tightly and she is dragged away. Sawyer and Kate hear her screams. They run to her and find her unconscious. They bring her back to camp, and the castaways fear the Others are back. Jack determines that Sun will be fine. Jin demands a gun to seek revenge. Despite Jack's wishes to wait for Sun to regain consciousness before an investigation, Sawyer and Kate return to the site of Sun's attack for an inspection. They find the burlap bag, which is a different make from the bag used by "Mr. Friendly" on Kate. They deduce that one of the survivors may have attempted the kidnapping. Kate suspects Ana Lucía, who she thinks wants to instill fear in the survivors so they will form an army against the Others.

Kate expresses her concerns to Jack, and asks Sawyer to alert Locke that Jack is coming for the guns. Locke decides to move the guns so Jack and Jin can't get at them.  Locke leaves Sawyer to "push the button" while he hides the entire arsenal. Jack enters the hatch in search of a gun, but finds the safe empty. Sawyer taunts him and tosses him the pain killers which Jack took from his tent. When Jack confronts Locke on the beach about the missing weaponry, Locke defends his actions by pointing out that Jack was about to break their agreement. During this heated discussion, shots ring out and Sawyer appears, wielding an automatic rifle. Sawyer reveals that the incident was an elaborate "long con" to seize the guns and declare himself the "new sheriff in town".  Unknown to the rest, the attacker in the garden (as well as the one who tracked Locke to the hiding place) was Charlie, who agreed to take part in the plot in order to humiliate Locke. Sawyer offers him one of the Virgin Mary statues, but he refuses it. Charlie asks Sawyer how anyone could think of such an ingenious plot, Sawyer remembers his long con of Cassidy for a moment, then replies, "I'm not a good person, Charlie. I never did a good thing in my life."

Sayid brings Hurley the radio, along with a transmission amplifier to boost the signal. They first pick up the sound of a female French voice speaking, which Sayid assumes is Rousseau's distress transmission, and then they pick up a radio transmission of Glenn Miller's "Moonlight Serenade".  Though Hurley initially assumes that they must be close to the transmission source, Sayid explains that, due to radio waves bouncing off the ionosphere, shortwave radio signals can potentially travel thousands of miles.  Sayid says it could be coming from any place, to which Hurley replies "...or any time", adding later that he was joking.

External links

"The Long Con" at ABC

References

Lost (season 2) episodes
2006 American television episodes